Gaspar Méndez (fl. 1546) was a Spanish architect of the mid 16th century. He was noted for his prolific work on buildings in Badajoz, notably Badajoz Cathedral and the Adoratrices chapel.  The tower of Badajoz Cathedral,  in height, was built in the Gothic style in 1542 under Méndez. Built with ashlar masonry, the windows are made of stone and carved. A street, Calle Gaspar Méndez, is named after him in the southwestern suburbs.

References

Spanish architects
16th-century Spanish people
People from Badajoz
1540s in Spain